Freddie Jones Field  is a city-owned, public-use airport located five nautical miles (6 mi, 9 km) southeast of the central business district of Linden, a city in Marengo County, Alabama, United States.

Facilities and aircraft 
Freddie Jones Field covers an area of 51 acres (21 ha) at an elevation of 161 feet (49 m) above mean sea level. It has one runway designated 18/36 with an asphalt surface measuring 3,390 by 80 feet (1,033 x 24 m). For the 12-month period ending May 3, 2010, the airport had 1,300 general aviation aircraft operations, an average of 108 per month.

References

External links 
 Aerial image as of 20 January 1992 from USGS The National Map

Defunct airports in Alabama
Airports in Alabama
Transportation buildings and structures in Marengo County, Alabama